Fc fragment of IgE, high affinity I, receptor for; alpha polypeptide, also known as FCER1A, is a protein which in humans is encoded by the FCER1A gene.

Function 

The high affinity IgE receptor plays a central role in allergic disease, coupling allergen and mast cell to initiate the inflammatory and immediate hypersensitivity responses that are characteristic of disorders such as hay fever and asthma. The allergic response occurs when 2 or more IgE receptors are crosslinked via IgE molecules that in turn are bound to an allergen (antigen) molecule. A perturbation occurs that brings about the release of histamine and proteases from the granules in the cytoplasm of the mast cell and leads to the synthesis of prostaglandins and leukotrienes—potent effectors of the hypersensitivity response. The IgE receptor consists of 3 subunits: alpha (this protein), beta, and gamma; only the alpha subunit is glycosylated.

References

Further reading

Fc receptors